Pacte de Famine (Famine Pact) was a conspiracy theory adopted by many living in France during the 18th century. The theory held that foods, especially grain, were purposely withheld from them, for the benefit of privileged interest groups. During this period French citizens obtained much of their nourishment from grain.

History

The famine plot has roots in pre-revolutionary France, while some of its strongest manifestations were evident during the 1760s and 1770s. The collective mentality surrounding this conspiracy served as a tool for French citizens to make sense of the political environment at the time.

Between 1715 and 1789 the population of France increased by 6 million, from 22 million to 28 million. Population growth and demographic changes during the 18th century help to explain the high demand for food, and lack of food supply at the time. Many faced hunger due to scarcity of food, and found it difficult to fend off illness. At times "bad grain" was blamed for making citizens sick.

Robert Jacques Turgot
From 1715–1774 Louis XV was the ruling King of France. During his reign many people faced famine and other struggles, living in a society in need of reform. Louis the XV was criticized for his lack of leadership, which hindered necessary reforms from being made. In 1774 when his successor Louis XVI took the throne, he worked early on to restore order within the kingdom. One of the first things he did was appoint Jacques Turgot as the Minister of Finances.

Turgot followed members of an early version of free market economics emerging in France at the time, inspired by Confucian teachings, known as Physiocracy. The physiocrats, or économistes as they called themselves, wanted to move away from Mercantilism, and felt it was possible to produce more value from the land. Dr. Francois Quesnay, Dupont de Nemours, and Vincent de Gournay were important pioneers of this movement and had a great impact on Turgot. Vincent de Gournay was the free market Intendant for Commerce and he and Turgot spent extensive time together. De Gournay’s opinion on what government economic policy should be was summarized in the term he laid claim to: "laissez faire, laissez passer", meaning leave it alone and let it pass, also known as the "invisible hand" notion. This economic principle did not favor government regulation and involvement in commerce. Turgot passionately defended Gournay’s belief in "laissez-faire" economic principles in his writing "Éloge de Gournay".

Before his appointment Turgot acted as Intendant of Limognes from 1761–1774. He had worked to implement free market reforms on a local scale. While acting as the Minister of Finances he worked to implement these reforms on a larger national scale. During his short time in office, Turgot established free trade in grain, worked to rectify the financial situation in France (focusing on industry and agriculture), and reform the system so that feudal privileges no longer existed.

Guild and grain regulation
In his efforts to revive the agricultural system, Turgot altered the urban production process. In 1775 he did away with guilds and moved the grain trade to a free trade system, removing police regulations.

In 18th century France, the role of police was far more involved than simply upholding the law. Police held responsibility over many systems in society, even street sweeping. The notion at the time was that all systems needed administrative managing, and that only the police could be trusted with keeping them in order. Once the guild system was transformed, to gain back a sense of control, police made it difficult for business owners to obtain licenses, by making applicants prove themselves "moral and solvent". These were businesses that Turgot had ordered be opened.

The guild dissolution prompted workers to riot, and social unruliness became a normal state of affairs. Guild members argued that this shift would lead to a more corporate system that would cause people to lose their sense of social identity, and that chaos and instability would result.

Changes to grain and bread supply had serious implications, and was met with even more disorder than was seen over the change in the guild system. This conflict was known as the Flour War of 1775. Reports from those that controlled the flow of grain stated there were problems with the grain harvest which caused shortages and less grain availability. The price of grain also increased, and became hard for some to afford. News of a grain shortage was met with skepticism and frustration rose from higher prices.

All tiers of society, including the poor, police and members of government, felt that the disruption of the grain and flour was done not for their sake, but to satisfy the agendas of interest groups, looking to make more money. They felt taken advantage of at the expense of their hunger. Those in opposition of the reform rioted, and seized grain that came in on shipments. They offered what they felt was the “just price” for it. This demonstrated a way in which the people took some power back into their own hands. This practice was known as “taxation populaire”, or popular taxation.

While there were documented efforts to deal with the grain shortage problems, such as increasing shipments from external sources, belief in the famine plot conspiracy remained. Conspiracy propaganda was rampant and quickly spread through the public. It eventually even reached Jacques Turgot, who came to have his own doubts about the situation. He suspected “agitation and bribery by his political rivals”.

A return to order
The disorder of the period proved to be so great that this economic experiment was stopped, and Turgot ended his career as the Minister of Finances in 1776. From 1775–1776 police returned to regulate the grain trade. Guilds were re-instated as well, but took a new form due to social changes taking place.

France would survive these food shortages, and a new era of industrialization would eventually emerge, in the leadup and aftermath of the Revolution of 1789. Agricultural techniques would become more modernized and productivity would increase over the next century, improving the life of many in France.

Notes

References
 Andress, David. French Society in Revolution, 1789–1799. France: Manchester University Press, 1999. 
 
 Kaplan, Steven. The Famine Plot Persuasion in Eighteenth-Century France. Pennsylvania: Diane Publishing Co, 1982. 
 Price, Roger. A Concise History of France, Second Edition. Massachusetts: Cambridge University Press, 2005.

External links
 David Andress, "French Society in Revolution, 1789–1799", 1999, Google Book Search
 Steven Kaplan, "The Famine Plot Persuasion in Eighteenth-Century France", 1982, Google Book Search
 Roger Price,  "A Concise History of France, Second Edition", 2005, Google Book Search

Economic history of the Ancien Régime
Political history of the Ancien Régime
18th century in France
Conspiracy theories in France